Mitchell David Albom (born May 23, 1958) is an American author, journalist, and musician. His books have sold over 40 million copies worldwide. Having achieved national recognition for sports writing in his early career, he turned to writing the inspirational stories and themes that weave through his books, plays, and films. Albom lives with his wife Janine Sabino in Detroit.

Early life
Albom was born on May 23, 1958, to a Jewish family in Passaic, New Jersey. He lived in Buffalo, New York for a little while until his family settled in Oaklyn, New Jersey, just outside of Philadelphia. He grew up in a small, middle-class neighborhood which most people never left. Albom was once quoted as saying that his parents were very supportive, and always used to say, "Don't expect your life to finish here. There's a big world out there. Go out and see it." Along with his older sister and younger brother he took the message to heart and traveled extensively. His siblings currently live in Europe.

Columnist
While living in New York, Albom developed an interest in journalism. Still supporting himself by working nights in the music industry, he began to write during the day for the Queens Tribune, a weekly newspaper in Flushing, New York. His work there helped earn him entry into the Columbia University Graduate School of Journalism. To help pay his tuition he took work as a babysitter. In addition to nighttime piano playing,  Albom took a part-time job with SPORT magazine. After graduation he freelanced as a sportswriter for Sports Illustrated, GEO, and The Philadelphia Inquirer, and covered Olympic sports events in Europeincluding track and field and lugepaying his own way for travel, and selling articles once he was there. In 1983, he was hired as a full-time feature writer for The Fort Lauderdale News and Sun Sentinel, and eventually promoted to columnist. In 1985, having won that year's Associated Press Sports Editors award for best Sports News Story, Albom was hired as lead sports columnist for the Detroit Free Press to replace Mike Downey, a popular columnist who had taken a job with the Los Angeles Times.

Albom's sports column quickly became popular. In 1989, when the Detroit Free Press and the Detroit News merged weekend publications, Albom was asked to add a weekly non-sports column to his duties. That column ran on Sundays in the "Comment" section and dealt with American life and values. It was eventually syndicated across the country. Both columns continue in the Detroit Free Press.

During his years in Detroit, he became one of the most awarded sports writers of his era. He was named best sports columnist in the nation a record 13 times by the Associated Press Sports Editors and won best feature writing honors from the AP a record seven times. No other writer has received the award more than once. He has won more than 200 other writing honors from organizations including the National Headliner Awards, the American Society of Newspaper Editors, the National Sportscasters and Sportswriters Association, and National Association of Black Journalists. On June 25, 2010, Albom was awarded the APSE's Red Smith Award for lifetime achievement, presented at the annual APSE convention in Salt Lake City, Utah. The selection was heavily criticized by a number of Albom's peers, including fellow Red Smith Award winner Dave Kindred. In 2013, Albom was inducted into the National Sports Media Association (formerly the National Sportscasters and Sportswriters Association) Hall of Fame and his induction into the Michigan Sports Hall of Fame was announced May 2017. Many of his columns have been collected into anthology books including Live Albom I (Detroit Free Press, 1988), Live Albom II (Detroit Free Press, 1990), Live Albom III (Detroit Free Press, 1992), and Live Albom IV (Detroit Free Press, 1995).

Albom also serves as a contributing editor to Parade magazine. His column is syndicated by Tribune Content Agency.

Fabrication scandal
In 2005, Albom and four editors were briefly suspended from the Detroit Free Press after Albom wrote a column that stated that two college basketball players were in the crowd at an NCAA tournament game when in fact they were not. In a column printed in the April 3, 2005, edition, Albom described two former Michigan State basketball players, both then in the NBA, attending an NCAA Final Four semifinal game on Saturday to cheer for their school. The players had told Albom they planned to attend, so Albom, filing on his normal Friday deadline but knowing the column could not come out until Sunday (after the game was over) wrote that the players were there. But the players' plans changed at the last minute and they did not attend the game. The Detroit Free Press also suspended the four editors who had read the column and allowed it to go to print. Albom was in attendance at the game, but the columnist failed to check on the two players' presence. A later internal investigation found no other similar instances in Albom's past columns, but did cite an editorial-wide problem of routinely using unattributed quotes from other sources. Carol Leigh Hutton, publisher of the Detroit Free Press at the time of the scandal, later told Buzzfeed that she regretted the way it was handled. "It was a stupid mistake that Mitch made that others failed to catch but not at all indicative of some problem that required the response we gave it. I allowed myself to believe that we were doing this highly credible, highly transparent thing, when really in hindsight what I think we were doing was acquiescing to people who were taking advantage of a stupid mistake."

Author

Sports books
Albom's first non-anthology book was Bo: Life, Laughs, and the Lessons of a College Football Legend (Warner Books), an autobiography of football coach Bo Schembechler co-written with the coach. The book was published in August 1989 and became Albom's first New York Times bestseller.

Albom's next book was Fab Five: Basketball, Trash Talk, The American Dream, a look into the starters on the University of Michigan men's basketball team that reached the NCAA championship game as freshmen in 1992 and again as sophomores in 1993. The book was published in November 1993 and also became a New York Times bestseller.

Tuesdays with Morrie

Albom's breakthrough book came about after he was rotating the TV channels and viewed Morrie Schwartz's interview with Ted Koppel on ABC News Nightline in 1995, in which Schwartz, a sociology professor, spoke about living and dying with a terminal disease, ALS (amyotrophic lateral sclerosis, or Lou Gehrig's disease). Albom, who was close to Schwartz during his college years at Brandeis University, felt guilty about not keeping in touch so he reconnected with his former professor, visiting him in suburban Boston and eventually coming every Tuesday for discussions about life and death. Albom, seeking a way to pay for Schwartz's medical bills, sought out a publisher for a book about their visits. Although rejected by numerous publishing houses, Doubleday accepted the idea shortly before Schwartz's death as Albom was able to fulfill his wish to pay Schwartz's bills.

Tuesdays with Morrie, which chronicled Albom's time spent with his professor, was published in 1997. The initial printing was 20,000 copies. As word of mouth grew, the book sales slowly increased and landed the book a brief appearance on The Oprah Winfrey Show, nudging the book onto the New York Times bestseller's list in October 1997. It steadily climbed reaching the number-one position six months later. It remained on the New York Times bestseller list for 205 weeks. One of the top selling memoirs of all time, Tuesdays With Morrie has sold over 20 million copies and has been translated into 45 languages.

Oprah Winfrey produced a television movie adaptation by the same name for ABC, starring Hank Azaria as Albom and Jack Lemmon as Morrie. It was the most-watched TV movie of 1999 and won four Emmy Awards.

The Five People You Meet in Heaven

After the success of Tuesdays with Morrie, Albom's follow-up was the fiction book The Five People You Meet in Heaven (Hyperion Books) which he published in September 2003. Although released six years after Tuesdays With Morrie, the book was a fast success and again launched Albom onto the New York Times best-seller list. The Five People You Meet in Heaven sold over 10 million copies in 38 territories and in 35 languages. In 2004, it became a television movie for ABC, starring Jon Voight, Ellen Burstyn, Michael Imperioli, and Jeff Daniels. Directed by Lloyd Kramer the film was critically acclaimed and the most watched TV movie of the year, with 18.7 million viewers.

For One More Day

Albom's second novel, For One More Day (Hyperion), was published in 2006. The hardcover edition spent nine months on the New York Times Bestseller list after debuting at the top spot. It also reached No. 1 on the USA Today and Publishers Weekly bestseller lists. It was the first book to be sold by Starbucks in the launch of the Book Break Program in the fall of 2006. It has been translated into 26 languages. On December 9, 2007, ABC television aired the 2-hour television event motion picture Oprah Winfrey Presents: Mitch Albom's For One More Day, which starred Michael Imperioli and Ellen Burstyn. Burstyn received a Screen Actors Guild Award nomination for her performance in the role of Posey Benetto.

For One More Day is about a son who gets to spend a day with his mother, who died eight years earlier. Charley "Chick" Benetto is a retired baseball player who, facing the pain of unrealized dreams, alcoholism, divorce, and an estrangement from his grown daughter, returns to his childhood home and attempts suicide. He meets his long dead mother there, who welcomes him as if nothing ever happened. The book explores the question, "What would you do if you had one more day with someone you've lost?"

Albom has said his relationship with his own mother was largely behind the story of that book, and that several incidents in For One More Day are actual events from his childhood.

Have a Little Faith

Have a Little Faith, Albom's first nonfiction book since Tuesdays With Morrie, was released on September 29, 2009, through Hyperion publishing, and recounts Albom's experiences that led to him writing the eulogy for Albert L. Lewis, a rabbi from his hometown in New Jersey. The book is written in the same vein as Tuesdays With Morrie, in which the main character, Mitch, goes through several heartfelt conversations with the Rabbi in order to better know and understand the man that he would one day eulogize. Through this experience, Albom writes, his own sense of faith was reawakened leading him to make contact with Henry Covington, the African-American pastor of the I Am My Brother's Keeper church, in Detroit, where Albom was then living. Covington, a past drug addict, dealer, and ex-convict, ministered to a congregation of largely homeless men and women in a church so poor that the roof leaked when it rained. From his relationships with these two very different men of faith, Albom writes about the difference faith can make in the world.

On November 27, 2011, ABC aired the Hallmark Hall of Fame television movie based on the book.

The Time Keeper

The book focuses on the inventor of the world's first clock, who is punished for trying to measure God's greatest gift. He is banished to a cave for centuries and forced to listen to the voices of all who came after him seeking more days and years. Eventually, with his soul nearly broken, Father Time is granted his freedom along with a magical hourglass and a mission: a chance to redeem himself by teaching two earthly people the true meaning of time. He returns to our world now dominated by the hour and commences a journey with two unlikely partners: a teenage girl who is about to give up on life and a wealthy old businessman who wants to live forever. To save himself he must save them both.

The First Phone Call from Heaven
In 2013, Albom moved to a new publisher, HarperCollins, for the publication of his seventh book and fourth novel. In The First Phone Call From Heaven, the small town of Coldwater, Michigan, is thrust into the international spotlight when its citizens suddenly start receiving phone calls from deceased loved ones. Is it the greatest miracle ever or a massive hoax? Sully Harding, a grief-stricken single father recently released from prison, is determined to find the truth. The town is fictional and not the real Coldwater, Michigan, but Albom pays tribute to the real small town in the book's acknowledgements. The First Phone Call from Heaven received starred reviews from Publishers Weekly and Library Journal.

The Magic Strings of Frankie Presto

In 2015, Albom's fifth novel, The Magic Strings of Frankie Presto, was published by HarperCollins. His longest book at almost 400 pages, it chronicles the life and mysterious death of the fictional musician Frankie Presto, as narrated by the voice of Music. An orphan born in a burning church in Spain in 1936, Frankie is blessed with musical ability. At nine years old, Frankie is sent to America in the bottom of a boat. His only possession is an old guitar and six precious strings. His Forrest Gump-like journey takes him through the musical landscape of the 20th century, from classical to jazz to rock and roll super stardom, meeting and working with other greats like Hank Williams, Elvis Presley, Carole King, Little Richard, and even The Beatles. Real musicians including Tony Bennett, Wynton Marsalis, Paul Stanley, Darlene Love, and Ingrid Michaelson, lent their names to first-person passages to the book.

An original 17-song soundtrack for the book was released by Republic Records four days before the book's release. It featured original songs written and performed by Albom and other artists including Sawyer Fredericks, Mat Kearney, Ingrid Michaelson, John Pizzarelli, and James Brent, interpreting Frankie Presto's "greatest hits", along with such older favorites featured in the novel such as Tony Bennett's "Lost in the Stars" and Dionne Warwick's "A House is Not a Home."

The Next Person You Meet in Heaven

A sequel to The Five People You Meet in Heaven, the novel tells the story of Eddie's heavenly reunion with Annie, the little girl he saved on earth in the first book. The story strongly emphasizes on how lives and losses intersect, and that not only does every life matter, but that every ending is also a new beginning. The book debuted at the top of the New York Times bestseller list.

Finding Chika

Albom's return to nonfiction for the first time in a decade. It is a memoir and a tribute to Chika, a young Haitian orphan who arrived at Albom's Have Faith Haiti Orphanage in Port Au Prince before being diagnosed with an aggressive brain tumor and passing away two years later.

An excerpt will be read by Albom on the new Lit Hub/Podglomerate Storybound (podcast), accompanied by an original score from musician Maiah Wynne.

The Stranger in the Lifeboat

Albom's seventh novel, The Stranger in the Lifeboat was published on November 2, 2021 in the US by Harper, and imprint of Harpercollins, and by Sphere, an imprint of Little, Brown Book Group in the UK. The book became a #1 New York Times bestseller in its first week of sales.

Radio host
Albom began on radio in 1987 on WLLZ-Detroit, a now-defunct Active Rock radio station. He worked on the station's morning program as a sports commentator, and started a Sunday night sports-talk program, The Sunday Sports Albom in 1988, believed to be one of the first sports talks shows to ever air on FM radio.

In 1996, he moved to WJR, a powerful,  clear-channel station in Detroit where he broadcasts a five-day a week general talk show with an emphasis on entertainment, writing, current events and culture. He has been honored by the Michigan Association of Broadcasters as the top afternoon talk show host, and was voted best talk show host in Detroit by Hour Detroit magazine. In 2001, the show was televised nationally in a simulcast by MSNBC. Albom continues to do the show from 5 to 7 p.m. ET. After his Monday show, he hosts an hour-long sports talk show called, "The Monday Sports Albom".

Television
Albom appeared regularly on ESPN's The Sports Reporters (aired Sunday mornings from Studio A in Bristol, Connecticut at ESPN Plaza at 9:00am EST) and regularly appears on SportsCenter. He has also made appearances on Costas Now, The Oprah Winfrey Show, The Today Show, CBS's The Early Show, ABC's Good Morning America, Dr. Phil, Larry King Live, The View, The Late Late Show with Craig Ferguson. He also appeared as a guest voice on The Simpsons on the episode Thursdays with Abie in 2010.

Playwright
On November 19, 2002, the stage version of Tuesdays with Morrie opened Off Broadway at the Minetta Lane Theatre. Co-authored by Mitch Albom and Jeffrey Hatcher (Three Viewings) and directed by David Esbjornson (The Goat or Who Is Sylvia?). Tuesdays with Morrie starred Alvin Epstein (original Lucky in Waiting for Godot) as Morrie and Jon Tenney (The Heiress) as Mitch.

His follow-up to the stage adaptation of Tuesdays were two original comedies that premiered at the Purple Rose Theatre Company in Chelsea, Michigan.The Purple Rose is a theater started by actor Jeff Daniels. Duck Hunter Shoots Angel (The Purple Rose's highest grossing play as of 2008) and And the Winner Is have both been produced nationwide, with the latter having its West Coast premiere at the Laguna Playhouse in Laguna Beach, California.

The premiere of Albom's Ernie, a play dedicated to the memory of famed Detroit Tigers broadcaster Ernie Harwell, occurred in April 2011 at the City Theatre in Detroit. In subsequent years the play travelled to theaters in Traverse City, East Lansing, and Grand Rapids. It has run for seven summer seasons as of 2017.

In the summer of 2016, Albom debuted his first musical at the City Theatre with "HockeyThe Musical!" A musical comedy with a book, original songs and parody lyrics written by Albom, "HockeyThe Musical!" follows five characters who work to convince God to spare hockey after concluding that the world has too many sports and one should be eliminated. An opening night review in The Detroit Free Press describe an "audience roaring for most of the 90 minutes"

Musician
Albom is an accomplished songwriter, pianist and lyricist. In 1992, he wrote the song "Cookin' For Two" for a television movie, Christmas in Connecticut, directed by Arnold Schwarzenegger. The song was nominated for The CableACE Award. Albom has been featured on the cover of Making Music Magazine. He also co-wrote the song "Hit Somebody (The Hockey Song)", which was recorded by singer/songwriter Warren Zevon with David Letterman on backup vocals. The song was released as a single in Canada and will be adapted into a film by director Kevin Smith. He performed with the Rock Bottom Remainders, a band of writers that also featured Dave Barry, Stephen King, Ridley Pearson, Amy Tan, Kathi Kamen Goldmark, Sam Barry, and Scott Turow from 1995 until the band dissolved in 2012 with the death of founder Kathi Goldmark. Their performances raised funds for various children's literacy projects across the country.

In July 2013, Albom co-authored Hard Listening (Coliloquy, 2013) with the rest of the Rock Bottom Remainders.  The ebook combines essays, fiction, musings, candid email exchanges, and conversations, compromising photographs, audio, and video clips, and interactive quizzes to give readers a view into the private lives of the authors.

Charity work
"The Dream Fund", established in 1989, provides a scholarship for disadvantaged children to study the arts. "A Time to Help" which started in 1998, is a Detroit volunteer group. "S.A.Y. (Super All Year) Detroit" is an umbrella program that funds shelters and cares for the homeless. It is now a 501(c)3 nonprofit organization that funds numerous homeless shelters throughout the Metro Detroit area.

His most recent effort, A Hole in the Roof Foundation, helps faith groups of different denominations who care for the homeless repair the spaces they use. Their first project was the I Am My Brother's Keeper roof in the crumbling but vibrant Detroit church, completed in December 2009. The second project, completed in April 2010, was the rebuilding of the Caring and Sharing Mission and Orphanage. It is now called the Have Faith Haiti Mission & Orphanage, in Port-au-Prince, Haiti.

Albom also directs the Have Faith Haiti Mission, a project whose stated objective is "dedicated to the safety, education, health and spiritual development of Haiti's impoverished children and orphans", incorporating language lessons and Christian prayer.

Other
During the Detroit newspaper strike of 1995–1997, Albom crossed the picket line and returned to work.

In 1999, Albom was named National Hospice Organization's Man of the Year.

In 2000, at the Emmy Awards, Albom was personally thanked by actor Jack Lemmon during his acceptance speech for his Emmy for Best Actor in a TV Movie or Miniseries for Tuesdays With Morrie. It would be Lemmon's last major acting role.

In February 2003, Albom was called to testify at Chris Webber's perjury trial. Webber had been a member of the University of Michigan's basketball teams of the early 1990s. He was a member of the "Fab Five" players, the subject of a book by Albom. Webber and three other Wolverines who played in the 1990s were alleged to have received over $290,000 in improper loans from a man considered to be a booster of the University of Michigan, although amounts were never verified. The four other Fab Five members were not implicated and the school was cleared of any direct involvement or knowledge of the loans, which were made to players and their families.

On November 22, 2005, Albom was the sole and final guest on Ted Koppel's farewell appearance on ABC's Nightline. Koppel had gotten to know Albom through his broadcasts with Morrie Schwartz and the final program dealt with the legacy of those shows and Albom's book.

On October 22, 2007, Albom appeared with former New York Governor Mario Cuomo and Tony Bennett in An Evening with Tony Bennett to honor the release of Bennett's Tony Bennett In The Studio: A Life of Art and Music, for which Albom wrote the foreword.

On May 30, 2017, Albom was one of eight new inductees announced for the Michigan Sports Hall of Fame in Detroit. The ceremony took place on September 15, 2017.

Selected books
Tuesdays with Morrie (1997) 
The Five People You Meet in Heaven (2003) 
For One More Day (2006) 
Have a Little Faith: A True Story (2009) , češtině Neztrácejte víru. Skutečný příběh (2011), překlad Tereza Kolesníková 
The Time Keeper (September 2012) 
The First Phone Call from Heaven (November 2013) 
The Magic Strings of Frankie Presto (November 2015) 
The Next Person You Meet in Heaven (October 2018) 
Finding Chika (November 2019)

References

External links

 
 

1958 births
20th-century American novelists
20th-century American male writers
Jack M. Barrack Hebrew Academy alumni
American columnists
American memoirists
American sports radio personalities
American talk radio hosts
Brandeis University alumni
Columbia University Graduate School of Journalism alumni
Columbia Business School alumni
Detroit Free Press people
Living people
People from Haddon Township, New Jersey
People from Oaklyn, New Jersey
Writers from Passaic, New Jersey
Radio personalities from Detroit
Red Smith Award recipients
Rock Bottom Remainders members
Sportswriters from Michigan
American male novelists
Writers from Detroit
MSNBC people
Jewish American writers
Novelists from New Jersey
Novelists from Michigan
American male non-fiction writers
Jewish American journalists
21st-century American male writers